Four Shōjo Stories is a shōjo manga anthology released by Viz Media in February 1996. It contains two stories by Keiko Nishi, and one each by Moto Hagio and Shio Satō. This was one of the earliest (if not the first) shōjo titles released in English in North America.

Plot
Promise
The brother and father of Reiko, a teenage girl, died not long after she was born. She must cope with her mother neglecting her, including her mother's decision to remarry. Reiko begins skipping school and she often meets by chance a boy who had helped her when she was little. He helps her get used to her new situation.

They Were Eleven
Ten young space cadets are put onto a decommissioned spaceship as their final test. If they pass this test, their lifelong dreams of being valued people in their respective societies will come true. They find upon reaching the ship that they have an eleventh member. The crew suffers hyperthermia because their ship is too close to a star, and they must find out which of their number is the spy.

The Changeling
In the distant future, Lin is employed to check up on Earth's terraforming efforts. She runs across a peaceful-seeming world, but her ship is nearly sabotaged.

Since You've Been Gone
An unfaithful husband is with his lover as an earthquake devastates his home. His wife refuses to be evacuated, as she wants to find a purse with "deep sentimental value".

Releases
Rachel Matt Thorn, a noted anthropologist, translated all four stories in the anthology. This anthology is unusual in the fact that Viz did not ask permission to publish the four stories as an anthology, and they had to pull it from the shelves when the original rights holder (Shogakukan) found out what they had done.  Of the four stories, They Were Eleven was distributed separately by Viz as a "monthly comic series" in 1995, Promise and Since You've Been Gone have been compiled in one floppy by Viz called Promise which came out in April 1994, and The Changeling was serialised in Animerica.
Four Shōjo Stories, Viz Communications, February 1996

Reception
Shaenon Garrity describes it as being "an odd mix" of stories, attributing this to the "very little" amount of shōjo manga available in English at that time.  She describes Promise as being "affecting", and regards the story of The Changeling to be "engaging", although she describes its art as "sparse and uneven". She believes the best of the four to be Hagio's They Were Eleven.  Garrity describes Four Shōjo Stories as being one of the best short manga anthologies in English. Debbie Carton, writing for Booklist, regarded the book as a "fascinating introduction to the world of shojo manga" and regarded the range of stories included to be a positive.  She recommended it for any collection including graphic novels.

References

External links
BookSwim reviews
TCJ review of They Were Eleven

1996 manga
Fantasy anime and manga
Manga anthologies
Moto Hagio
Romance anime and manga
Science fiction anime and manga
Shogakukan manga
Shōjo manga
Viz Media manga